Karimanal Venkatesan Anand (30 October 1966  30 April 2021) was an Indian cinematographer, film director and photojournalist, worked mainly in the Tamil film industry. After a short period as a journalist, he became a cinematographer in the early 1990s, working on about fifteen films in the Southern and Hindi cinema industries. Anand won the National Film Award for Best Cinematography for his debut film as a cinematographer, Thenmavin Kombath. In 2005, Anand turned film director with the critically acclaimed Kana Kandaen. He was a founding member of the Indian Society of Cinematographers (ISC).

Early life 
Anand was born in Chennai, in the state of Tamil Nadu in India on 30 October 1966 to Karimanal Munuswamy Venkatesan and Anusuya Venkatesan. His childhood days were spent in Pulicat. He graduated with a bachelor's degree in Physics from DG Vaishnav College in June 1986,
followed by a master's degree in Visual Communications from Loyola College, Chennai. During his college days Anand participated in annual trekking expeditions in the Himalayas. His exploratory trips to various remote locations in India triggered his passion for photography. Anand participated in inter-collegiate, state and national level photography contests. His visual images earned him numerous photography awards.

Career

Photo journalist (1988–1992) 
Anand worked as a freelance photo journalist for leading newspapers and magazines such as Kalki, India Today, Illustrated Weekly, Aside and other national publications. Within a short period of time, his photos were published in more than 200 magazine covers and had taken photos of 10 Chief Ministers in close quarters. Anand continued to freelance in industrial photography, advertisements and cover pages for fictional Tamil novels.

Cinematographer 
Anand met cinematographer P. C. Sreeram and expressed his interest to work for him as an assistant. He joined him, serving as an apprentice for Sreeram's film such as Gopura Vasalile, Amaran, Meera, Devar Magan and Thiruda Thiruda. Actually, he joined as the sixth assistant to Sreeram when Jeeva, another prominent figure in cinematography was the first assistant to Sreeram. When director Priyadarshan had approached P. C. Sreeram to work on his Malayalam film, Thenmavin Kombath (1994), he was unavailable and thus recommended Anand to be given the opportunity. The film received positive reviews and Anand won the National Film Award for Best Cinematography for his debut venture, with the award committee noting he showed "outstanding cinematography executed with sincerity, imagination and flexibility". Anand's first Tamil film was the romantic drama Kadhal Desam (1996), which also won critical acclaim for showcasing Chennai in a futuristic mould. He also then teamed up with director Shankar for the production of the political thriller Mudhalvan (2000), winning appreciation for his experimental camera ramping and the general grandeur.

Anand has wielded the camera for 14 films in languages including Tamil, Telugu, Malayalam and Hindi. His final work as a cinematographer came with Sivaji (2007), the Rajinikanth-starrer directed by Shankar, the most expensive Tamil film ever made at the time of release.

Film director 
Anand turned a film director with Kana Kandaen (2005), a thriller film starring Srikanth, Prithviraj and Gopika. The film opened to favourable reviews from critics, with a reviewer from Rediff.com noting "Anand has succeeded in making an extremely watchable, highly thrilling film with a 'different' story". Despite the success of the film, Anand opted to return to cinematography to fulfil commitments for Rajinikanth's Sivaji (2007) directed by Shankar, which became the most expensive Tamil film ever made at the time.

Anand then collaborated with AVM Productions and Suriya in Ayan (2009), an action entertainer set on the backdrop of the Indo-African drug smuggling trade. In order to prepare the script, Anand did a lot of research and is said to have spoken to a lot of custom officers to understand the modus operandi of smuggling. The film opened in April 2009 to positive reviews, and became one of the year's highest-grossing Tamil language films. A critic from Rediff.com called the film a "must-watch" adding "what gets you by surprise is the thread of logic that laces practically every encounter, and the way Anand's screenplay covers all the angles". A reviewer from Sify.com stated "Anand pushes the commercial cinematic envelope and brings a savvy freshness in treatment and packaging hitherto unexplored in Ayan".

His third directorial venture, Ko (2011), narrated the tale of photojournalists caught up in a political corruption scandal. Starring Jiiva, Ajmal Ameer, Karthika Nair and Piaa Bajpai, the film also received a positive from film critics and the box office. A reviewer from The Hindu described the film as a "tale with a realistic twist" and mentioned that Anand "strikes gold with Ko". The critic added "blending the commercial with the realistic is a challenge, but Anand proves adept at it." Likewise, The Times of India noted "With Ko, director Anand gives notice of his immense talent once again, making a movie that is all set to lord over the box office this summer".

Anand worked with Suriya again in Maattrraan (2012), and was inspired to make the film after watching a documentary about the conjoined twins Chang and Eng Bunker. While preparing the script, he worked closely with a team of doctors to ensure the medical condition of open-heart transplant, as shown in the film, could be showcased as realistically as possible. He later made a mythical thriller film, Anegan (2015) starring Dhanush, and another political thriller film, Kavan (2017), with Vijay Sethupathi. His final film Kaappaan (2019), starring Suriya and Mohanlal, told the tale of a Special Protection Group (SPG) officer who protects the Prime Minister.

Style of working
Anand has collaborated with composer Harris Jayaraj, editor Anthony and script writers Subha for several of his ventures, describing them as "constant fixtures". While noting he shared a good rapport with Jayaraj, he has stated that Anthony is like his "alter ego" and "his biggest critic", with the pair often working closely during the post-production stages of films. He met the writer duo Suresh and Bala of Subha, during his stint as a photo journalist with the magazine, India Today. Jagan has a part in most of his films. Despite being a cinematographer himself, Anand opted not to wield the camera for his own ventures and has actively tried to select different cinematographers for each of his projects, like Soundararajan. S, M. S. Prabhu, Richard M. Nathan, Om Prakash and Abhinandan Ramanujam.

During the script-writing process, Anand often finished up to six drafts, though mentioned he rarely "locks his script", suggesting it is always open to changes for improvisations on the shooting spot. He often rephrased dialogues; and sometimes has invented titles during the drafting process, being constantly on the lookout for short and crisp titles. His titles are usually in Chaste Tamil, such as Ayan, Ko, Anegan and Kavan.

Death 
Anand died in Chennai in the early hours of 30 April 2021 following a cardiac arrest. At the time, he was tested positive for COVID-19.

Filmography

As cinematographer
Source(s):

As director
Source(s):

As actor 
Source(s):
 Meera (1992) as Vikram's friend (uncredited)
 Sivaji: The Boss (2007) guest appearance in song "Ballelakka"
 Maattrraan (2012) guest appearance as a protester in the song "Yaaro Yaaro"
 Kavan (2017) as tea seller (cameo)

Awards

!
|-
!scope="row"| 1994
|Thenmavin Kombath
|National Film Award for Best Cinematography 
| 
| style="text-align:center;"|
|-
!scope="row"|1996
|Kadhal Desam
|Screen Award for Best Cinematography 
| 
| style="text-align:center;"|

|-
!scope="row"|2000
|Josh
|Screen Award for Best Cinematography
| 
| style="text-align:center;"|

|-
!scope="row"|2002
|The Legend of Bhagat Singh
|SICA Award for Best Cinematography
| 
| style="text-align:center;"|

|-
!scope="row"|2007
|Sivaji
|Filmfare Award for Best Cinematographer – South
| 
| style="text-align:center;"|

|-
!scope="row"|2009
|Ayan
|Filmfare Award for Best Director – Tamil
| 
| style="text-align:center;"|

|-
!scope="row"|2011
|Ko
|Filmfare Award for Best Director – Tamil
| 
| style="text-align:center;"|

|-
!scope="row"|2012
|Maattrraan
|SIIMA Award for Best Director
| 
| style="text-align:center;"|

|}

References

Further reading
 in TeluguCinema.com, 2009
 Interview in Rediff, 2005
 Interview in Chennai Online 
 
 Interview in TeluguCinema.com, 2007

External links
 

1966 births
2021 deaths
20th-century Indian photographers
21st-century Indian film directors
21st-century Indian photographers
Best Cinematography National Film Award winners
Cinematographers from Tamil Nadu
Deaths from the COVID-19 pandemic in India
Film directors from Chennai
Filmfare Awards South winners
Indian Tamil people
Loyola College, Chennai alumni
Malayalam film cinematographers
Tamil film cinematographers